Noma, NoMa, or NOMA may refer to:

Places
 NoMa, the area North of Massachusetts Avenue in Washington, D.C., US
 NoMa–Gallaudet U station, on Washington Metro
 Noma, Florida, US
 NOMA, Manchester, a redevelopment in England
 Noma District, Ehime, a former district in Iyo Province, Japan
 Noma Station, Mihama, Aichi, Japan

People

Given name
Noma, a diminutive of the Russian name Avtonom
Noma Bar (born 1973), Israeli-British artist
Noma Dumezweni (born 1969), Swazi-British actress
Noma Gurich (born 1952), American judge

Surname
Akiko Noma (born 1980), Japanese musician
Akinori Noma, Japanese electrophysiologist
Hiroshi Noma (1915–1991), Japanese author
Seiji Noma (1878–1938), Japanese writer and publisher

Arts, entertainment, and media
Noma Prizes, Japanese literary awards
Noma Award for Publishing in Africa

Biology
Archipsocus nomas, a barklouse of the family Archipsocidae
Euxoa nomas, a moth of the family Noctuidae
Noma pony, a Japanese pony breed

Brands and enterprises
NOMA (company), US lighting manufacturer 
Noma (restaurant), Copenhagen, Denmark

Healthcare
Noma (disease), an often fatal mouth infection
Noma neonatorum, a cutaneous condition

Organizations
New Orleans Museum of Art, US
National Organization of Minority Architects, US professional organization
Noma Dōjō, Tokyo, Japan

Other uses
Noma (のま), a Kanji iteration mark
NOMA or Non-overlapping magisteria, a viewpoint about science and religion
USS Noma (SP-131), a patrol craft 1917–1919
, a telecommunications technology

See also
Gnoma, a genus of longhorn beetles

Japanese-language surnames